The SV Kickers Pforzheim is a German association football club from the town of Pforzheim, Baden-Württemberg.

The club was formed in a merger of two local clubs in Pforzheim in 2011. Its greatest success came in 2014 when it won promotion to the Oberliga Baden-Württemberg, the highest football league in the state.

History
The club was formed in 2011 in a merger of Germania Brötzingen and 1. FC Eutingen. Of the two clubs Germania Brötzingen had been the more successful, playing as high as the Gauliga Baden in the 1930s. Eutingen's greatest achievements were two seasons in the Amateurliga Nordbaden and a Baden Cup win in 1950. The merger came only a season after two other well known Pforzheim clubs, 1. FC Pforzheim and VfR Pforzheim merged to form 1. CfR Pforzheim.

The new club inherited the league place of Germania Brötzingen in the tier seven Landesliga Mittelbaden. After a seventh place in 2012 the club won this league and promotion the following season. In its first year in the Verbandsliga Baden Kickers won the league and earned promotion to the Oberliga. The club came last in the Oberliga in 2014–15 and was relegated back to the Verbandsliga, followed by a last place in this league in 2015–16. Instead of relegation, Kickers' first team resigned from competitive football. Amid financial constraints leading to the departure of many players, the club was inactive in 2016–17 to form youth teams. The first team joined the C-Klasse for the 2017–18 season.

Honours
The club's honours:
 Verbandsliga Baden
 Champions: 2014
 Landesliga Mittelbaden
 Champions: 2013

Seasons
The season-by-season performance of the club:

Key

References

External links
 Official team site  
 Das deutsche Fußball-Archiv  historical German domestic league tables
 Kickers Pforzheim at Weltfussball.de  

Football clubs in Germany
Football clubs in Baden-Württemberg
Association football clubs established in 2011
2011 establishments in Germany
Pforzheim